Genies is an American avatar technology company founded by Akash Nigam and Evan Rosenbaum in 2017. Genies' consumer app allow users to create fully personalized avatars to be used in apps such as Giphy, iMessage, and Instagram. Genies also offers a software development kit (SDK) enabling brands to create a branded avatar experience and online marketplace directly in their apps. The company also consists of an Avatar Agency that creates digital versions of its clients.

History 
When Nigam was a junior in college at the University of Michigan studying computer science and economics, he met University of Pennsylvania student, Evan Rosenbaum, and soon after, the two co-founded a company called Blend. Blend started as a mobile app for college students that gifted items in exchange for sharing photos. The co-founders received an acquisition offer but declined. Shortly after, the pair began using much of Blend’s proprietary technology to build Genies.

In 2021, Genies started offering non-fungible tokens (NFTs) in partnership with celebrities such as musician Shawn Mendes.

In March 2022, then-former Disney CEO Bob Iger joined the board of the company.

In August 2022, the company released its NFT storefront, “The Warehouse.” The storefront will be open on Dapper Labs’ Flow blockchain and allows users to download the Genies Studio app to create their own avatars and buy digital fashion items to dress them. Because each item is an NFT, the original creator gets a cut of the revenue each time that item is resold and owns the intellectual property behind the design.

Funding 
The company has raised $40 million in funding from Silicon Valley venture capitalists such as Jim Breyer, NEA, and Foundation Capital. In addition to traditional VC firms. Genies has also received funding from other sources, such as entrepreneurs, talent agencies, and Fortune 500 companies. Genies currently employs 90 people and the company is valued at over $100 million. In November 2020, Japanese multinational video game developer and publisher Bandai Namco Entertainment announced a $3 million investment in Genies including an expansion in Asia.

References

External links

2017 establishments in the United States
Companies based in Los Angeles
Virtual avatars